Romain Sartre (born 12 November 1982) is a French professional footballer. He plays for FC Villefranche.

Honours
 Trophée des Champions: 2003

References

External links
 

1982 births
Living people
Association football defenders
French footballers
Olympique Lyonnais players
Stade Lavallois players
CS Sedan Ardennes players
RC Lens players
Tours FC players
LB Châteauroux players
Nîmes Olympique players
Ligue 1 players
Ligue 2 players
FC Villefranche Beaujolais players